The women's 1500 metres race of the 2015–16 ISU Speed Skating World Cup 1, arranged in the Olympic Oval, in Calgary, Alberta, Canada, was held on 15 November 2015.

Brittany Bowe of the United States won the race on a new world record, while compatriot Heather Richardson-Bergsma came second, and Martina Sáblíková of the Czech Republic came third. Miho Takagi of Japan won the Division B race.

Results
The race took place on Sunday, 15 November, with Division B scheduled in the morning session, at 09:30, and Division A scheduled in the afternoon session, at 12:30.

Division A

Note: WR = world record, NR = national record.

Division B

Note: NR = national record, NRJ = national record for juniors.

References

Women 1500
1